Lover Boy is the sixth studio album by the American recording artist Ariel Pink, under the artist's "Haunted Graffiti" musical project. It is the sixth release in the eponymous series of works.

The album was originally released in 2002 through Ballbearings Pinatas and CD Baby as part of a double-CD set with his previous release, House Arrest. In March 2006, the album was reissued as a single album on CD-R. The reissue includes a slightly different set of tracks from the original album, cutting the songs "Credit" and "One on One" from the line-up and adding the live song, "You Are My Angel".

Track listing

"Don't Talk To Strangers"
"Didn't It Click?"
"She's My Girl"
"Poultry Head"
"Older Than Her Years"
"So Glad"
"Want Me"
"Loverboy" with John Maus
"Jonathan's Halo"
"Hobbies Galore" by R. Stevie Moore
"I Don't Need Enemies (Holy Shit Single 45)" with Matt Fishbeck
"Let's Get Married Tonite"
"Ghosts" with John Maus
"Phoebus Palast" with coL
"Blue Straws" with Brandt Larson
"The Birds They Sing In You" with coL
"New Trumpets Of Time" with coL
"Doggone (shegone)"
"You Are My Angel (Live)"

Personnel 
coL played drums on "Poultry Head", drum programming, guitars, vocals on "New Trumpets Of Time".

On "New Trumpets of Time" Pink only played  bass and synthesizers on the track. The song was originally created with coL for his album, but because coL took a long time to compile this album; Pink really thought the track should be heard, and he placed it on his record.

References

2002 albums
Ariel Pink albums
Albums recorded in a home studio